Chris Harris (February 19, 1948 – December 19, 2015) was an American politician and attorney who served in the Texas Senate and Texas House of Representatives.

Biography 
Chris Harris was born on February 22, 1948, in Pasadena, California. He graduated from Arlington High School, in Arlington, Texas. Harris attended Texas Christian University, and received his Doctor of Jurisprudence from Baylor Law School. Harris practiced family and business law. He and his wife, Tammy, lived in Arlington, Texas. He died at a hospital in Fort Worth on December 19, 2015, at the age of 67.

Political career
Harris served in the Texas House of Representatives from 1985 to 1991 and then served in the Texas State Senate from 1991 to 2013. Harris was a Republican.

Election history 
Election history of Harris from 1992.

Most recent election

2004

Previous elections

2002

2000

1996

1994

1992

References

External links 
Project Vote Smart - Senator Chris Harris (TX) profile
Follow the Money - Chris Harris
2006 2004 2002 2000 campaign contributions

1948 births
2015 deaths
Republican Party Texas state senators
Republican Party members of the Texas House of Representatives
People from Pasadena, California
People from Arlington, Texas
People from Mansfield, Texas
Texas Christian University alumni
Baylor Law School alumni
Texas lawyers
21st-century American politicians
20th-century American lawyers